Bucculatrix perfixa is a moth of the family Bucculatricidae. It was first described in 1915 by Edward Meyrick and is found in Australia.

External links
Australian Faunal Directory

Moths of Australia
Bucculatricidae
Moths described in 1915
Taxa named by Edward Meyrick